
Gmina Pabianice is a rural gmina (administrative district) in Pabianice County, Łódź Voivodeship, in central Poland. Its seat is the town of Pabianice, although the town is not part of the territory of the gmina.

Villages
Gmina Pabianice contains the villages and settlements of Bychlew, Górka Pabianicka, Gorzew, Hermanów, Huta Janowska, Jadwinin, Janowice, Konin, Kudrowice, Majówka, Okołowice, Osiedle Petrykozy, Pawlikowice, Petrykozy, Piątkowisko, Porszewice, Rydzyny, Świątniki, Szynkielew, Terenin, Władysławów, Wola Żytowska, Wysieradz and Żytowice.

Neighbouring gminas
Gmina Pabianice is bordered by the towns of Konstantynów Łódzki, Łódź and Pabianice, and by the gminas of Dłutów, Dobroń, Lutomiersk, Rzgów, Tuszyn and Wodzierady.

References
Polish official population figures 2006

Pabianice
Pabianice County